Q Pootle 5 is a 2013 animated television series based on the books Q Pootle 5 and Q Pootle 5 in Space by author Nick Butterworth. It revolves around the title character Q Pootle 5 and his friends, and is set on and around the fictional planet Oki Doki.

Development 
Author and executive producer Nick Butterworth chose Q Pootle 5 from amongst his other children's books as the character to develop into an animated series because, as an alien, he would not be culturally tied to any one location. He developed the series with his son Ben, who suggested they form their own production company. Together with Nick's wife Annette they added additional characters and locations to those already seen in the books, before producing a pilot clip with animation studio Blue-Zoo from which a series was commissioned.

Music is an important element of Q Pootle 5. Producer Ben Butterworth says ″When we started to consider the music for the programme we didn’t want music to be just an accompaniment to the story, we wanted people’s experience to be enhanced by the music. The score had to be integral to the storytelling – creating atmosphere, adding nuance and subtlety, underpinning the emotional content of a story, driving the action of a scene, or making us laugh.″

Characters

Main characters 
 Q Pootle 5, known as "Pootle" to his friends, is a friendly green alien and the lead character in the show. He enjoys stargazing on top of the camper van where he lives and spending time with his friends.
 Oopsy is Pootle's best friend. She is pink and has a lot of hair that sticks straight up. Oopsy lives in an upside-down rocket, and enjoys drawing and spending time with Pootle.
 Eddi is a Conjoined twin  purple alien. He talks to himself a lot, and is less confident than the other characters. Eddi enjoys tinkering with his rocket, and adding to his string collection.
 Stella is yellow and wears pink wellington boots. She lives in a treehouse and loves gardening most of all, but she also likes to play her bagpipes whenever there's an opportunity to do so.
 Ray is a blue major bird. He lives with Stella, and can sometimes be a bit grumpy. He has a fear of heights, and an intense dislike of Stella's bagpipes.
 Groobie is the oldest of the gang. He is orange with thick purple eyebrows, and can be a bit forgetful. He lives in a shack in front of a junk yard full of scrap items which he occasionally restores. Everyone likes to gather at Groobie's because he makes the best smoothies in the galaxy.
 Bud-D is Groobie's robot. He is enthusiastic and well-intentioned, but often malfunctions.
 Planet Dave lives within view of Oki Doki. He is big enough for everyone to land their ships on when they visit him, and is very old indeed.

Additional characters 
 Roy is a turquoise major bird, seen in the episode A Friend For Ray.
 Maurice is a caterpillar who Stella finds on a plant that Pootle has given her in the episode Maurice.
 Planet Roger is not seen in series one, but in the episode Groobie to the Rescue, Groobie reads out a letter sent to Planet Dave from Planet Roger.
 Comet Gordon visits Planet Dave once every 3 million years.

Episodes 

There are 52 episodes of the Q Pootle 5 series. Each episode has a running time of approximately 11 minutes. Additionally, there is one 26-minute long Christmas special episode called Pootle All The Way.

References

External links 
 Q Pootle 5 at CBeebies
 

BBC children's television shows
British children's animated science fiction television series
British computer-animated television series
British preschool education television series
2010s British children's television series
2010s British animated television series
CBeebies
Animated television series about extraterrestrial life
Animated preschool education television series
2010s preschool education television series
English-language television shows